The forty-fifth season of the NBC sketch comedy series Saturday Night Live (also branded Saturday Night Live 45 and SNL45) premiered on September 28, 2019, during the 2019–20 television season with host Woody Harrelson and musical guest Billie Eilish, and concluded on May 9, 2020 with host Kristen Wiig and musical guest Boyz II Men. This season featured the return of Eddie Murphy as host, on December 21, 2019, for the first time in 35 years. 

Due to the COVID-19 pandemic, the season was temporarily halted on March 16, 2020. The move came hours after New York City Mayor Bill de Blasio ordered all theaters in the city to close by the following morning. The season resumed on April 11, 2020 with three remotely produced episodes containing Weekend Update and other contributions from the cast. The self-filmed episodes, with pre-recorded from-home segments, were instead referred to as Saturday Night Live at Home. The first remote episode was hosted by Tom Hanks, who survived COVID-19 after being diagnosed the month prior. The third of these episodes, airing on May 9, 2020 and hosted by former cast member Kristen Wiig, served as the show's season finale.

Cast
Prior to the beginning of the season, longtime cast member Leslie Jones, who joined the cast one month into season 40 in October 2014, left after having been with the show for almost five full seasons. Three new featured players were announced on September 12, 2019: impressionist and writer Chloe Fineman of The Groundlings, stand-up comedian Shane Gillis, and SNL staff writer Bowen Yang (who had appeared as Kim Jong-Un in a season 44 episode hosted by Sandra Oh). 

Yang is the first fully East Asian-American cast member in the show's history.

Fineman had auditioned for the show in 2018 for the previous season, but did not make the cast for that year. She ended up being invited back for another audition for the next season. 

The choice of Gillis as a cast member generated backlash after podcast clips of him making racist remarks were reposted, including referring to presidential candidate Andrew Yang using a racial slur. Gillis has also made derogatory remarks about Muslims, women, and the LGBTQ community on his online show Matt and Shane's Secret Podcast. Gillis was let go from the cast only four days after the announcement of his hiring, prior to the airing of the first episode.

Heidi Gardner and Chris Redd (both originally hired in 2017 at the start of season 43) were upgraded to repertory status this season, while Ego Nwodim (who joined the show in 2018 for its previous season) remained a featured player.

Pete Davidson took a leave of absence at the beginning of the season, missing the first two episodes before returning for the third, due to filming commitments of The Suicide Squad. Despite this, Davidson was still credited in the episodes he missed.

Cast roster

Repertory players
 Beck Bennett
 Aidy Bryant
 Michael Che
 Pete Davidson
 Mikey Day
 Heidi Gardner
 Colin Jost
 Kate McKinnon
 Alex Moffat
 Kyle Mooney
 Chris Redd
 Cecily Strong
 Kenan Thompson 
 Melissa Villaseñor

Featured players
 Chloe Fineman
 Ego Nwodim
 Bowen Yang

bold denotes "Weekend Update" anchor

Writers

Dan Bulla, Emma Clark, Dan Licata, and Jasmine Pierce were added to the writing staff. Michael Che, Colin Jost, and Kent Sublette continue as head writers for the show.

This was the final season for longtime writer James Anderson. Anderson had been a writer for the show since 2000.

Episodes

==== Saturday Night Live at Home ====

On March 16, 2020, it was announced that due to the COVID-19 pandemic, the episodes that were to air March 28, April 4, and April 11 were cancelled, with reruns shown in place of the first two. John Krasinski and Dua Lipa had been announced as host and musical guest for March 28 episode; both were rescheduled to the following season. The Strokes were scheduled to perform on the April 11 episode to promote their new album The New Abnormal; they were rescheduled to the following season. During her monologue in the 46th season, Issa Rae said she was supposed to have hosted the show "back in March". Aidy Bryant's plans to leave at the end of the season were disrupted by the COVID-19 pandemic; she stayed for two additional seasons, and left in 2022.

The show resumed on April 11 in a new format, with cast members remotely appearing from their homes via video conferencing. The new format for the show became known as Saturday Night Live at Home.
{{Episode table
|background=#fee72c
|overall=
|season= 
|aux1=
|aux1T=Host 
|aux1R=
|aux2=33
|aux2T=Musical guest 
|aux2R=
|airdate=
|airdateR=
|viewers=cha
|viewersT=Ratings/Share
|episodes=

Specials

Notes

References

45
Saturday Night Live in the 2010s
Saturday Night Live in the 2020s
2019 American television seasons
2020 American television seasons
Television shows directed by Don Roy King
Television productions suspended due to the COVID-19 pandemic